Captains of the Sands is a Brazilian novel written by Jorge Amado in 1937.

The novel tells of a gang of one hundred street children. Their ages range from seven to sixteen and they live by begging, gambling, stealing and burglary in the streets of Salvador, Bahia, Brazil. The protagonist is Pedro Bala, the leader of the gang, and other important characters include the Professor, Boa-Vida, Barandão, João Grande and Sem-Pernas.

Critics have tended to dismiss Amado's earlier works, such as Captains of the Sands, as being political rather than literary and for incorporating popular culture, such as Candomblé and Malandragem. In response, Amado said that he set out to tell a story to be enjoyed by all, not to please critics, and to show solidarity with the humanity portrayed in the books.

Probably for this reason Captains of the Sands is one of the most popular books among students in Brazil and the story is still known for its socialist themes. Amado was a member of the Brazilian Communist Party at the time he wrote it, and the book belongs to the Socialist realism in vogue at the time.

In the year of publication 808 copies were burnt in a square in Salvador, together with works of other authors, under the pretext that they were communist propaganda.

In a postface to the book, Amado wrote that this was the sixth and final work in the cycle he called "The Bahian Novels" in which he had tried to set down the "life, the customs, the language of my State".

Film & TV

The book inspired the 1971 American film The Sandpit Generals and the 2011 Brazilian film Capitães da Areia.

The 1989 Brazilian TV series Capitães da Areia was also based on the book.

References 

1937 Brazilian novels
Novels by Jorge Amado
Portuguese-language novels
Novels about orphans
Novels set in Bahia